Qala FK was an Azerbaijani football club based in Baku. The club played in the Azerbaijan First Division.

History 
The club was established in 2012 and immediately joined Azerbaijan First Division. On 20 August 2013, the club announced to be defunct and stopped their participation in First Division.

Stadium 

Qala's home ground was Zira Olympic Sport Complex Stadium, which has a capacity of 1,500.

League and domestic cup history

References

External links 
 PFL

Football clubs in Azerbaijan
2012 establishments in Azerbaijan
Association football clubs established in 2013
Association football clubs disestablished in 2013
Defunct football clubs in Azerbaijan